The Vice Chief of the Air Staff (VCAS) is the principal deputy and second-in-command (S-in-C) of the Pakistan Air Force, reporting under the Chief of Air Staff. The post is usually held by an Air Marshal, a three-star rank air force general, who is responsible for flight safety, intelligence, procurement, public relations, and the Air War College.

The current VCAS is Air Marshal Muhammad Zahid Mahmood. He succeeded Air Marshal Syed Noman Ali to the post on 21 March 2022.

List of Vice Chiefs of the Air Staff

All persons mentioned below have served as the Vice Chief of the Air Staff.

See also
 Vice Chief of Army Staff (Pakistan)
 Vice Chief of Naval Staff (Pakistan)

References

Pakistan Air Force
Pakistan Air Force appointments